Denmark competed at the 2016 Winter Youth Olympics in Lillehammer, Norway from 12 to 21 February 2016.

Alpine skiing

Boys

Girls

Cross-country skiing

Boys

Freestyle skiing

Ski cross

See also
Denmark at the 2016 Summer Olympics

References

2016 in Danish sport
Nations at the 2016 Winter Youth Olympics
Denmark at the Youth Olympics